Pierre, marquis de Ségur (13 February 1853 in Paris – 13 August 1916 in Poissy) was a French writer and historian, elected a member of the Académie française in 1907. The eldest son of Anatole, marquis de Ségur, and of Cécile Cuvelier, he was thus the grandson of Sophie Rostopchine, Comtesse de Ségur.

Works
Le maréchal de Ségur, 1895
La dernière des Condé, 1899
Jeunesse du maréchal de Luxembourg, 1900
Gens d'autrefois, 1903
Parmi les cyprès et les lauriers, 1912

References
 Notice biographique de l'Académie française 

1853 births
1916 deaths
Writers from Paris
Collège Stanislas de Paris alumni
Members of the Conseil d'État (France)
Chevaliers of the Légion d'honneur
19th-century French writers
20th-century French writers
French biographers
19th-century French historians
20th-century French historians
Members of the Académie Française
Marquesses of Ségur
French male non-fiction writers
Members of the Ligue de la patrie française